Anne-Pia Nygård (born August 10, 1977) is a Norwegian writer. Her debut book was the 2009 autobiography What Nobody Sees (Det som ingen ser).

Biography 
Nygård is born and raised in the village Sandane, Gloppen; her mother from the same place, her father from Askøy.

She attended Firda Upper Secondary School from 1993 until 1996 and later earned her bachelor in North Germanic languages and English language. Her writing debut came about in the spring of 2009, as she was halfway to a master of Nynorsk language and writing. The book, What Nobody Sees was written in nynorsk. In September 2012 the English version will be published by Loaghtan books.

Nygård was born with a curvature of the spine that worsened as she grew. The condition resulted in much of her childhood spent in and out of hospitals, where she underwent numerous operations. She experienced various accidents and medical mistakes. At ten years of age she lost the use of her legs and became dependent on the wheelchair. Her authorship is based on her experiences with her disability. She describes the embarrassments and confusions of childhood, as well as her meeting with health professionals and coping with family life. The book gives an educational view aimed at health professionals and others work with disabled children and youths.

The autobiography is written i third person giving her the objectivity to comment her own sufferings, thoughts and actions.

Bibliography 
 2009: What Nobody Sees (Det som ingen ser), Norske Bøker, Illustrasjoner: Dag E. Thorenfeldt, 264 sider, 

References

 External links 
bokkilden.no: About the writer and the book, Det som ingen ser'' (Norwegian).
What Nobody Sees by Anne-Pia Nygard

1977 births
Norwegian autobiographers
Nynorsk-language writers
People from Gloppen
Living people